Ernest Moore (6 July 1865 – 16 September 1940) was an English painter. His work was part of the painting event in the art competition at the 1932 Summer Olympics.

References

1865 births
1940 deaths
20th-century English painters
English male painters
Olympic competitors in art competitions
People from Barnsley
20th-century English male artists